Cotopaxi is an unincorporated town, a post office, and a census-designated place (CDP) located in and governed by Fremont County, Colorado, United States. The CDP is a part of the Cañon City, CO Micropolitan Statistical Area. The Cotopaxi post office has the ZIP Code 81223. At the United States Census 2010, the population of the Cotopaxi CDP was 47, while the population of the 81223 ZIP Code Tabulation Area was 1,639 including adjacent areas.

History
The town was named after Cotopaxi Volcano, one of the highest active volcanoes in the world, located in Ecuador. Henry Thomas was the man responsible for naming Cotopaxi. He was an early prospector to the western territory in the mid-nineteenth century. Cotopaxi is also known for its early failed colony of approximately 63 Russian-Jewish immigrants who first settled there in early 1882. These colonists, most of whom were related, traveled to Colorado in hopes of starting a successful farming community and to reap the benefits of the new Homestead Act, which would grant each head male of a family  of land. When the colonists arrived in Cotopaxi, they discovered that only half of the houses that were promised to be built upon their arrival had actually been erected; this forced many of the families to live out of small makeshift canvas houses during the first winter. In addition to the housing problems, the colonists faced an extreme shortage of supplies that were needed to support them through the first winter and to plant their crops. Desperate to plant their crops, the colonists soon opened large lines of credit with the local store to buy the seeds and equipment they needed to get their crops planted. The variety of crops that the colonists chose to plant mostly consisted of potatoes and corn. The immigrants soon discovered, however, that the climate in the Colorado mountains was only suitable for growing crops for less than four months out of the year, and the first frost of winter killed most of what was still planted in the fields. This failed season of crops forced the immigrants to look for jobs elsewhere to help pay off their fast-growing debt to the local store. They soon found work with the Denver and Rio Grande Railroad which had decided to lay down more tracks to the west over Marshall Pass. The men of the colony were paid three dollars a day, which helped the struggling settlement get through its first winter. The colonists made it to spring, but the second crop was also a failure, and entire families soon started leaving. Only about six families remained in Cotopaxi to plant a third crop, which was wiped out by a large blizzard, and this officially ended the attempted farming colony in early June 1884.

Cotopaxi was a small train stop on the Denver and Rio Grande Western Railroad along the Arkansas River. Though there is a store serving the main highway through the town (U.S. 50), there are no major businesses in Cotopaxi (owing to the small population) except for a whitewater rafting business that attracts thousands of tourists each year to ride on the Arkansas River.

Geography

Demographics

Economy
Today, Cotopaxi has a few small businesses, the most notable of which is the Cotopaxi General Store. This general store was opened in the early 1920s and has since been connected to a Sinclair gas station.

Education
Cotopaxi is home to Cotopaxi School District Fremont RE-3. The school district directs the educational needs of western Fremont County including Cotopaxi and the surrounding communities of Coaldale, Howard, Swissvale, Wellsville and the Copper Gulch area. Cotopaxi has two schools, Cotopaxi K-8 School and Cotopaxi High School located north of U.S. Highway 50.

Highways
U.S. Highway 50

See also

Outline of Colorado
Index of Colorado-related articles
State of Colorado
Colorado cities and towns
Colorado census designated places
Colorado counties
Fremont County, Colorado
Colorado metropolitan areas
Front Range Urban Corridor
South Central Colorado Urban Area
Cañon City, CO Micropolitan Statistical Area

References

External links

Cotopaxi @ Colorado.com
Cotopaxi @ UncoverColorado.com
Cotopaxi History
Cotopaxi, Colorado Mining Claims And Mines
Fremont County website

Census-designated places in Fremont County, Colorado
Census-designated places in Colorado
Colorado populated places on the Arkansas River
1882 establishments in Colorado
Jews and Judaism in Colorado
Russian-American culture in Colorado
Russian-Jewish culture in the United States